Cai Wan (1695-1755), was a Chinese poet.

She was the daughter of the noble official Cao Yurong and married to the cabinet minister Gao Quizhou. She was educated within Confucianism, and published her own collection of poems. Cai Wan had an acknowledged influence as the adviser of her spouse, who reportedly confided his suggestions to her before introducing them to the government.

References 
 Lily Xiao Hong Lee; Clara Lau; A. D. Stefanowska: Biographical Dictionary of Chinese Women: v. 1: The Qing Period, 1644-1911 

1695 births
1755 deaths
18th-century Chinese people
18th-century Chinese poets
Chinese women poets
18th-century Chinese women writers